Smilin' at Trouble is a 1925 American silent Western film directed by Harry Garson and starring Maurice 'Lefty' Flynn, Helen Lynch and Kathleen Myers. Location shooting took place around San Pedro and at a dam construction site, likely the Pit 3 Dam in Northern California.

Plot
As described in a film magazine review, Michael Arnold, a wealthy contractor who hopes to crash into high society with the aid of Lafaette Van Renselaer, a worthless and dishonest aristocratic youth he carried on a dam construction job, engages  a young civil engineer Jerry Foster to help him over several structural difficulties in the work. The engineer falls in love with his employer’s daughter Alice, and she returns his affection until she believes him to be in love with another woman. The  dishonest youth’s success in having used inferior cement in the dam results in a flood in which he is drowned. The engineer saves his employer’s daughter from death and he and she are wed.

Cast

References

Bibliography
 Connelly, Robert B. The Silents: Silent Feature Films, 1910-36, Volume 40, Issue 2. December Press, 1998.
 Katchmer, George A. Eighty Silent Film Stars: Biographies and Filmographies of the Obscure to the Well Known. McFarland, 1991.
 Munden, Kenneth White. The American Film Institute Catalog of Motion Pictures Produced in the United States, Part 1. University of California Press, 1997.

External links

 

1925 films
1925 Western (genre) films
1920s English-language films
American silent feature films
Silent American Western (genre) films
American black-and-white films
Films directed by Harry Garson
Film Booking Offices of America films
1920s American films